Ejin Banner Taolai Airport  is a regional airport serving Ejin Banner in Inner Mongolia, China.

Overview
Taolai Airport is one of the three airports of Alxa League in western Inner Mongolia, the other two being Alxa Left Banner Bayanhot Airport and Alxa Right Banner Badanjilin Airport. The three airports form a commuter airport network that connects the three banners of Alxa League, which covers a vast area of the Gobi Desert.

Construction for the airports started in August 2012, with a total investment of 389.5 million yuan, and all three airports opened on 17 December 2013. All three airports are classified 3C, suitable for 50-seat aircraft such as the Xian MA60. Taolai Airport is projected to handle 80,000 passengers annually by 2020, compared with 250,000 for Bayanhot and 45,000 for Badanjilin.

Airlines and destinations

See also
List of airports in China
List of the busiest airports in China

References

Airports in Inner Mongolia
Airports established in 2013
2013 establishments in China
Buildings and structures in Alxa League